Líšťany refers to the following places in the Czech Republic:

 Líšťany (Louny District)
 Líšťany (Plzeň-North District)